Guy Rouleau (April 16, 1965 – December 7, 2008) was a Canadian ice hockey player.

Early life 
Rouleau was born in Beloeil, Quebec. He won the Michel Brière Memorial Trophy as the most valuable player in the Quebec Major Junior Hockey League for his play with the Hull Olympiques during the 1985–86 QMJHL season.

Career 
Rouleau was not drafted in the NHL Entry Draft and never played in the National Hockey League. He played three seasons in the American league with the Sherbrooke Canadiens (1986–88) and the Springfield Falcons (1989–90). He also played for various minor league teams until 1998. Rouleau also played for the Montreal Roadrunners (1994–97) and Ottawa Loggers (only two games) in the now defunct inline hockey league Roller Hockey International. At the 1986 Memorial Cup, Rouleau tied Jeff Larmer's record for points in a Memorial Cup with 16.

Personal life 
Rouleau died from complications related to a brain tumor on December 7, 2008.

Career statistics

References

External links

1965 births
2008 deaths
Amstel Tijgers players
Canadian ice hockey centres
Erie Panthers players
HC Fiemme Cavalese players
Hull Olympiques players
Ice hockey people from Quebec
Longueuil Chevaliers players
Montreal Roadrunners players
Ottawa Loggers players
Peoria Rivermen (IHL) players
Reno Rage players
Springfield Indians players
Canadian expatriate ice hockey players in the Netherlands
Canadian expatriate ice hockey players in Italy